Disciples: Sacred Lands is a turn-based PC strategy game published by Strategy First in 1999. Set in a fantasy world known as the Sacred Lands, it depicts a battle for dominance between four races of the world of Nevendaar: The Empire (humans), the Mountain Clans (dwarves) the Legions of the Damned (demons), and the Undead Hordes (undead). In 2001, an expanded version of the game was released titled Disciples: Sacred Lands - Gold Edition. It added 25 new scenarios.

Gameplay
Gameplay consists of three major components: The Capital City, where the player recruits units, constructs buildings, and researches spells, The Adventure Map, where the player leads Heroes and their parties to explore the land, and the Battle Screen, where battles are fought whenever hostile parties meet on the adventure map.

The game has many similarities with the Heroes of Might And Magic series, such as having a leader, creature slots, city improvements, an adventure map with resources and hostile creatures, along with the turn-based gameplay.

Key characteristics of Disciples:
Small squads with Experience: As opposed to the rival Heroes of Might and Magic franchise, armies in Disciples are not composed of 'stacks' but of small groups of individual units which can only be recruited at the lowest level and upgrade as they gain experience.
Fixed battle positions: The battles are not fought on a 'map' where units can move about. They have specific stations, but their representation on a plane is purely symbolic, and they can attack any enemy targets (although there are restrictions about ranks and melee attacks), similar to the battle system in tactical RPGs.
Distinctive Art style: The graphics and art in Disciples, both computer and hand-drawn, have always had a very distinctive style to them, with very dark browns and sombre colours, baroque details, and skewed proportions. The overall atmosphere of the game is greatly enhanced by the characteristic graphics.

Reception

Critical reviews

The game received "favorable" reviews according to the review aggregation website GameRankings.

Sales
According to Strategy First, the game "didn't get great distribution" in its initial run.

Awards
The game won the award for "Best Game No One Played" at GameSpots Best & Worst of 1999 Awards, and was a runner-up for the "Best Graphics, Artistic Design" award, which went to Rayman 2: The Great Escape.

Sequels
Three sequels have been released: Disciples II: Dark Prophecy in 2002, Disciples III: Renaissance in 2009, and Disciples: Liberation in 2021.

References

External links
 Official website (archived)
 

1999 video games
Fantasy video games
GT Interactive games
Strategy First games
Turn-based strategy video games
Video games about angels
Video games developed in Canada
Video games with isometric graphics
Windows games
Windows-only games